is a former Japanese politician of the Democratic Party of Japan and a former member of the House of Representatives in the Diet (national legislature). She was elected for the first time in 2009. Japanese media revealed that Hayakawa was a former swimsuit model and called her one of "Ozawa's girls" in reference to Ichirō Ozawa, the DPJ leader at the time. In 2010 Hayakawa was part of a parliamentary delegation to President of the Republic of China Ma Ying-jeou. In 2012 Hayakawa appeared as a ring girl at a professional boxing match.

A native of Katsushika, Tokyo, she attended California State University, Sacramento.

References

Living people
1971 births
Democratic Party of Japan politicians
Female members of the House of Representatives (Japan)
Members of the House of Representatives (Japan)
21st-century Japanese politicians
21st-century Japanese women politicians